HMS Augusta was a 60-gun fourth-rate ship of the line of the Royal Navy, built to the 1733 proposals of the 1719 Establishment at Deptford Dockyard, and launched on 1 July 1736.

Augusta was active in the Caribbean during the Seven Years' War. Arthur Forrest became the ship's commander in 1757. On 23 December 1757 she sighted an armed 9-ship French convoy off of Haiti, which was disguised under neutral Dutch flags. The convoy, led by the 32-gun Le Mars, wrongly assumed Augusta was a Dutch warship. Forrest fired a broadside at Le Mars that resulted in the ship's surrender, as well was the capitulation of the entire convoy. Forrest and Augusta captured the 400-ton French ship Pallas after a 5-day chase in October 1758. The prize, laden with oil, wine, and other goods, was valued at over two million livres.

Augusta served until 1765, when she was broken up.

This British ship served as the inspiration to Danish shipbuilder Andreas Gerner in designing the 50-gun ship-of-the-line . Senior lieutenant A Gerner had been impressed by Augustas sailing qualities while he was on a study tour of Britain during the 1730s.

Notes

References

 Lavery, Brian (2003) The Ship of the Line - Volume 1: The development of the battlefleet 1650-1850. Conway Maritime Press. .

Ships of the line of the Royal Navy
1730s ships